Mahashian Di Hatti Private Limited, doing business as MDH, is an Indian spice producer and seller based in New Delhi, India. It is the second largest leader in the Indian market with 12% market share, following S. Narendrakumar's Everest Spices.

CEO Mahashay Dharampal Gulati died on 3 December 2020, due to cardiac arrest.

After the demise of Mahashay Dharampal Gulati, his son Mr. Rajeev Gulati took over his legacy as the famous "King of Spice", The Face of MDH.

History
Mahashay Chunnilal Gulati set up the masala company in 1919 in Sialkot, British India currently located in the Punjab province of Pakistan since 1947. It is associated with Mahashay Chunnilal Charitable Trust.

Mahashay Dharampal Gulati, the son of the founder moved to Delhi after the partition of India. He opened a shop in a shack and started selling spices like his father. He later opened his shop at Ajmal Khan Road, Karol Bagh and expanded from there. In 1959 he bought a plot in Kirti Nagar to set up his own spice factory.

From there, he built the entire group to one of India's leading spices manufacturers expanding to 15 factories. Speaking to The Economic Times last year, he said, "My motivation to work is being sincere in product quality sold at affordable prices. And nearly 90% of my salary goes to charity in my personal capacity."

At the age of 94, Dharam Pal was the highest paid Fast Moving Consumer Goods (FMCG) CEO in India in 2017. Two years later, on 16 March 2019, the 14th President of India Ram Nath Kovind conferred the Padma Bhushan award for Trade & Industry.

Current status
MDH today has a range of 62 products available in over 150 different packages. These include ground and blended spices, which are free of preservatives. MDH also sells other products, such as saffron.

MDH is India's Biggest Spice Producer and seller. It not just has a user base in India but also overseas. However, the rumours of it being sold to Unilever were hot in the market. MDH, Through its official social media handles, has refuted all the false rumours.

Charity work
MDH under the leadership of Mahashay Dharampal Gulati has developed more than 20 schools including MDH International School, Mahashay Chunnilal Saraswati Shishu Mandir (named after his late father), Mata Lilawati Kanya Vidyalaya (named after his late wife), and Mahashay Dharampal Vidya Mandir etc.

He started a 10-bed eye hospital at Arya Samaj, Subhash Nagar, in November 1975. Later in January 1984, a 20-bed hospital was established in Janakpuri, New Delhi to commemorate his late mother Mata Chanan Devi.

References

External links

Food and drink companies established in 1919
Food and drink companies of India
Indian brands
Companies based in New Delhi
Food and drink companies based in Delhi
Manufacturing companies based in Delhi
Incense companies
Indian companies established in 1919
Recipients of the Padma Bhushan in trade and industry